Klaus Mertens (born 1950 in Bonn) is a German contemporary artist. He is currently residing in Berlin and Addis Ababa.

Background
Mertens studied and worked within the field of architecture in the 1970s. In 1984 he studied fine arts at the Berlin University of the Arts under Georg Baselitz, and graduated in 1991 with a master's degree. Having been attracted by African culture and art, he travelled to Ethiopia for the first time in 2007, and started teaching at Addis Ababa University in 2010. While teaching there, he founded a new class for lithography.

Career 
In his early career, Klaus Mertens created a series of large woodcuts he called “Woodcut Tattoos”. 

Mertens’ “Social Prints” works show images such as landscapes and portraits, combining elements of pop art and traditional woodcarving. When he moved to Ethiopia, Mertens' artwork expanded to sculpturing, photography and design. There, he started creating three-dimensional sculptures. Using materials such as plastic bags, branches, bones or animal skulls, he created several pieces of art, including Fashion Racks (2008), Jungle Fighter (2009), Knitted Egg (2014), True to Nature (2015), Global Suit (2015), and Hypoxylon Addis (2015).

His 2012 exhibition "Big Pretenders, Trophies and a Drunken Donkey" at the Asni Gallery in Addis Ababa was a reflection of the human behavior of wasting nature or hunting for trophies, practiced all over the African continent.

Since 2010, Mertens has created sculptures that can be used as furniture as well, following the tradition of artists like Richard Artschwager or Ron Aaron.

In 2013, Mertens established a partnership between the ASFAD and the Dresden Academy of Fine Arts. He coordinates an exchange program between both academies.

Selected exhibitions
Solo shows:
 2016 - Lela Gallery, Addis Ababa
 2015 - Alliance Ethio Francaise, Addis Ababa
 2012 - Asni Gallery,  Addis Ababa
 2011 - Alliance Ethio Francaise, Addis Ababa
 2010 - German House, Addis Ababa
 2009 - Commerzbank Representative Office, Addis Abeba
 2008 - Showroom, Addis Ababa. Addis Ababa School of Fine Art & Design. Lela Galery, Addis Ababa.
 2007 - Gallery Molitoris, Hamburg
 2006 - Management Consultant Cap Gemini, Berlin
 2005 - Gallery Kunstraum Haerten, Tübingen
 2003 - Gallery Molitoris, Hamburg
 2002 - Gallery Tammen und Busch, Berlin. Gallery im Amtshof, Feldkirchen, Austria.
 2000 - Kunstverein mittleres Kinzigtal, Stadt Wolfach, Germany. Kunstraum Wedding, „Körperbilder“, Berlin.
 1998 - Galerie im Prater, Berlin. Visolux Electronic GmbH, Berlin
 1997 - Galerie Papist und Beyenburg, Köln
 1996 - Dirty-Windows-Gallery, Berlin
 1995 - Preisträger Kunst am Bau Villach, Austria
 1994 - Galerie Slama, Klagenfurt, Austria. Galerie Studio 2, Köln. Allianz Generalagentur, Berlin.
 1993 - Galerie Röller/Ravens, Berlin
 1991 - Wintergarten im Literaturhaus, Berlin. Selbsthilfegalerie Crellestraße, Berlin.
 1989 - Centro d'àrte ecultura di Sermoneta, Latina, Italy
 1988 - Galerie Vinzenz Sala, Berlin
 1987 - Galerie Roland Schneider, Berlin

Group shows
 2019 - Mikser Festival, Dorćol, Belgrade, Serbia
 2016 - Projektraum Kunstquartier Bethanien, Berlin
 2015 - Millerntor Gallery, Hamburg
 2013 - National Museum of Ethiopia, Addis Ababa
 2012 - Laphto Art Gallery, Addis Ababa
 2011 - Atelier Gallery, Addis Ababa
 2008 - Lela Gallery, Addis Ababa
 2006 - “Hochdruckzone”, Städtische Galerie Reutlingen. Galerie Tammen, Berlin. Kunstraum Haerten, Tübingen. „Neue Hozschnitte der XYLON“, Spendhaus Reutlingen. Gewerbemuseum Winterthur. Zentrum für moderne Kunst St.Pölten. Neue sächsische Galerie Chemnitz. Galerie Schwartzsche Villa, Berlin. Galerie Tammen und Busch, Berlin. Galerie Papist & Beyenburg, Köln. Galerie Johnson und Johnson, „Zeitriss“ Berlin.
 1995 - Museum für Zeitgenössische Kunst, Mantova, Italy
 1994 - Kultur am Nauener Platz, „Heimat Geld“, Berlin
 1992 - Alte Essig-und Senffabrik Neukölln, Berlin. Galerie Lebendiges Museum
 1988 - Kunstverein Niebüll
 1989 - Künstlerbahnhof Westend, Berlin

Collections:
 Sammlung Willy Brandt Haus, Berlin
 Sammling Investitionsbank Berlin
 Artothek NBK, Berlin

References

Books
 ato klaus: "Branches & Bones", 

1950 births
German artists
Living people